The Missing Peace is the eleventh studio album by American hard rock band L.A. Guns.

Released on October 13, 2017 through Frontiers Records, it can be considered a reunion recording, as it is the first album of new material featuring both singer Phil Lewis and guitarist Tracii Guns in 15 years. The track listing was revealed on their Facebook page. The album debuted on the U.S. Top Hard Rock Albums Chart at 16.

The first single, "Speed", as well as an accompanying video, was released by Frontiers Records on July 12, 2017.

It is the only studio album with the guitarist Michael Grant.

Track listing

All songs written by Tracii Guns, Phil Lewis, Michael Grant, Johnny Martin, Shane Fitzgibbon, and Mitch Davis, except "The Devil Made Me Do It" written by Michael Grant, Kenny Kweens, and Lonny Paul Johnson.

Personnel
 Phil Lewis – lead vocals
 Tracii Guns – lead guitar
 Johnny Martin – bass guitar
 Shane Fitzgibbon – drums
 Michael Grant – rhythm guitar

Charts

Made in Milan

Made in Milan is a live album by American glam rock band L.A. Guns. It’s the only Live Album to contain bassist Johnny Martin, rhythm guitarist Michael Grant and drummer Shane Fitzgibbon.

Track listing

Personnel
 Tracii Guns – Lead Guitar
 Phil Lewis – Lead Vocals
 Michael Grant – Rhythm Guitar & Backing Vocals
 Johnny Martin – Bass Guitar & Backing Vocals
 Shane Fitzgibbon – Drums

References

2017 albums
Albums produced by Andy Johns
L.A. Guns albums